The spot-breasted antvireo (Dysithamnus stictothorax) is a species of bird in the family Thamnophilidae.
It is found in south east Brazil. Its natural habitats are subtropical or tropical moist lowland forest and subtropical or tropical moist montane forest. It is becoming rare due to habitat loss.

The spot-breasted antvireo was described by the Dutch zoologist Coenraad Jacob Temminck in 1823 and given the binomial name Myothera strictothorax (an error for stictothorax)). The specific epithet is from the Ancient Greek stiktos "spotted" and thōrax or thōrakos "breastplate". It is now placed in the genus Dysithamnus which was introduced by the German ornithologist Jean Cabanis in 1847.

References

External links
Xeno-canto: audio recordings of the spot-breasted antvireo

spot-breasted antvireo
Birds of the Atlantic Forest
spot-breasted antvireo
Taxonomy articles created by Polbot